Wilhelm Hölter (12 March 1904 – 25 February 1989) was a German painter. His work was part of the painting event in the art competition at the 1932 Summer Olympics.

References

1904 births
1989 deaths
20th-century German painters
20th-century German male artists
German male painters
Olympic competitors in art competitions
People from Lemgo